Aurelio Martínez, professionally known as Aurelio, is a Honduran musician and politician. He is a singer, percussionist, and guitarist known for his Garifuna music and is considered a Cultural Ambassador of the Garifuna people. According to the Guardian, he became the leading Garifuna performer after the death of musician Andy Palacio.

From 2006 to 2010, Martinez served as a congressman for the National Congress of Honduras, becoming its first black member.

Biography 

Singer-songwriter, guitarist and percussionist, Aurelio Martinez aka AURELIO (born 1969), is one of Central America's most gifted performers. Born in Honduras, the artist is known for his powerful and evocative voice. He is a major tradition-bearer of the Garifuna culture and music and he is considered nowadays as the Cultural Ambassador of the Garifuna nation.

The Garinagu, commonly known as the Garifuna are people of Amerindian and West African descents who live along the coasts of Belize, Guatemala, Honduras, and Nicaragua. The original home of the Garifuna is St. Vincent (one of the windward islands in the West Indies) from which they were deported in 1796 by the British government and landed on Roatan island, situated in the Bay Islands of Honduras.

Aurelio grew up in a small Caribbean village called Plaplaya, surrounded by a family of talented musicians. His father was a well-known local troubadour who improvised Paranda songs containing Garifuna roots rhythms and Latin sounds. Following the influence of his uncles and grandfather, he became a brilliant drummer in his early childhood. From his vocally gifted mother, he learned to sing and picked up many songs she crafted. Actually, Aurelio began performing at Garifuna ceremonies when just a boy, even at the most sacred events where children were usually not even allowed. At the age of 14, the young man became a respected musician with a firm grounding in Garifuna rhythms, rituals and songs.

While attending secondary school at the provincial capital of La Ceiba, Aurelio dove into diverse and innovative musical projects that took him outside the traditional sphere of performance. By this time, he played professionally with popular Latin ensembles and refined his musical skills.

In the late 80's, he created his first group called Lita Ariran, who was one of the first Garifuna traditional music and dance group to appear on the international scene and most specifically in Japan. His first album was produced by his friend Akira Tomita with the Japanese company JVC World Sounds (Grupo Garifuna de Honduras, LITA ARIRAN (JVC Records, 1995). Later, Aurelio received the award for the Best singer of Garifuna music and his group Lita Ariran was rewarded for the Best cultural group of the year at the Garifuna World Music Awards, in New York (1998). The less we could say is that Lita Ariran's first and unique album remains most certainly a legendary treasure of the Garifuna music nowadays.

In 1997, Aurelio meets his Belizean friend and fellow musician Andy Palacio. The two artists struck up a decades-long friendship thanks in part to their shared hopes for the future of Garifuna music and culture. Through Palacio, Aurelio met Ivan Duran, the tireless producer behind Belize's Stonetree Records. The same year, the young artist participated in a paranda project, including the King of Paranda Paul Nabor "Nabi", Junie Aranda, Jursino Cayetano, Andy Palacio, among others. Critics around the world acknowledge PARANDA: AFRICA IN CENTRAL AMERICA (Stonetree Records, 1999) as being one of the best albums to come out of this part of the world. It is in fact a very rich collection of three generations of paranderos with a depth and range that grows with each listen. From the haunting, bluesy exuberance of Paul Nabor's "Naguya Nei" to the fresh sounds of Aurelio's "Africa", this album takes the listener through the tapestry of feeling and soulful striving that lies at the heart of the Garifuna culture.

In 2004, Aurelio releases his first solo album called GARIFUNA SOUL produced by his friend and long time collaborator Ivan Duran (Stonetree Records, 2004), backed by some of Belize's and Honduras’ best studio musicians who improvised adeptly on Garifuna percussion, saxophone, electric and bass guitars. Undoubtedly, the artist takes the music into the future without compromising whatsoever the cultural foundations of his inspiration. Aurelio's rich resonant voice and soulful acoustic songs caught the attention of the global music press and saw him as a tradition-bearer with an innate musicality and subtle innovative streak. Indeed, AfroPop Worldwide names him “Newcomer of the year”.

Two years later (2006), Aurelio, a new born gifted musician takes on another role as a politician in the Honduran National Congress, becoming this way the first Garifunacongressman of his region in the country's history. For this occasion, the politician's main goal was to represent and support the Garifuna people through concrete manifestations that would protect their integrity as a whole. Precisely, the idea was to lead innovative actions to improve the daily life of this population as well as to feed and preserve their cultural treasures.

In the meantime, the Spanish public television (RTVE) produces: Honduras y Belice: la Aventura Garifuna, an original documentary that features simultaneously, the encounter between old paranda's singers and the Garifuna's way of life of yesterday and today's generations. Aurelio is the star of this journey: a very popular young musician who later becomes known as one of the best paranderos. Thanks to its richness, this documentary is definitely an interesting audiovisual reference to introduce oneself into the surrounding world of the artist.

In 2007, Aurelio was invited to participate in the album WATINA (Stonetree Records, Cumbancha, 2007) featuring Andy Palacio and The Garifuna Collective who received the prestigious WOMEX Award, a respected acknowledgment from the world music industry. Additionally, the album Watina was declared the Greatest World Music Album of All Times by Amazon.com in 2010.

Andy Palacio passed away unexpectedly at the young age of 48, leaving the Garifuna community stunned and bereft. ”Aurelio was still a congressman, but he left the congress session to go to Belize for the funeral,” Duran recalls. “He hadn’t been playing guitar for months because of his intense political commitments. But after Andy’s passing, he gave a few concerts and he knew he needed to start recording right away.”

Together with Ivan Duran, several veteran Garifuna musicians, and the occasional local ensemble dropping into the studio, Aurelio began laying down the tracks for this recording in a cabana on the beach. Laru Beya was not only a way of honoring Andy Palacio as a person; it was a means for continuing his mission of uplifting and expanding what it meant to be a Garifuna artist.

By the year 2008, Aurelio was selected worldwide musician by the Afropop legend Youssou N’Dour, within the Rolex Mentor and Protégé Arts Initiative. Most definitely, this was a major event allowing Aurelio and the Garifuna music to open up for the first time to African famous musicians. With no doubt, this opportunity of sharing was another main step in the artist's developing career. Aside of exchanging valuable points of view about the former it gave him new ideas about musical technical features as well as an exciting possibility to share the stage with Youssou N’ Dour in places such as Senegal, New York (Nokia Theater) and Vienna (Vienna Jazz Festival). At the end of this journey, Aurelio's dream of traveling one day to the African continent finally became true.

Three years later, as part of a result of Youssou N’Dour's collaboration, Aurelio releases his second album LARU BEYA (Stonetree Records, Real World Records, SUBPOP, 2011), a compilation of soulful songs linking back to the African roots. N’Dour adds his stirring vocals to two of its songs, while elsewhere there is backing from those great veterans of the Afro-Cuban scene, Orchestra Baobab, and from Senegalese rapper Sen Kumpé. Laru Beya wins sixth place in the Top 20 World Music Albums of 2011 in the WorldMusic.co.uk Award. “Aurelio is a highly talented musician, conscious composer and passionate performer with an excellent band behind him, as well as being the prime advocate for a unique culture. If anyone is going to put the Garifuna culture onto the map, it is Aurelio Martinez”, wrote the WorldMusic.co.uk website.

After his debut in the African scene, Aurelio makes a return to his musical roots with his third album LANDINI, (Stonetree Records, Real World Records, 2014). This last composition draws a traditional scenario of the Garifuna community way of life. Most specifically, the album shows a gentle picture of the paranda musical environment in Plaplaya, the artist's dear hometown. Traditionally, after a long day of fishing, villagers return into their boats to the river landing and gather for a convivial paranda session. This symbolic image leads us to the album's present name: “landini”, from the English word: “landing”.

According To Aurelio, "I consider this album to be the sound of my Garifuna people. On the previous album [Laru Beya] we experimented and collaborated with other artists to reconnect what was lost between Africa and America. This album is purely Garifuna, and the entire spirit of the music reflects the Garifuna experience. My mother is the sole inspiration for this album. She sees herself reflected in me, to a large degree, the only one of the family who could fulfill her dream of singing professionally. She's the best example I have in my life of what a human being should be, my main consultant and confidante."

Lándini was named to multiple 2014 year-end critics lists, including: #3 on The Sunday Times Ten Best World Music Albums of 2014, #3 on fRoots Critic's Poll New Albums of 2014, #2 World Music Central Best World Music Albums 2014, Songlines 10 Best Albums of the Year 2014, Curious Animal's Best Albums of 2014, #1 Songlines 50 Greatest World Music Albums of the Last Years.

The Garifuna community of New York honored Aurelio in March 2015 with a special musical tribute and concert to celebrate the 30th anniversary of his career.

On 17 January, Aurelio launched his new album DARANDI, a collection of Aurelio's favorite songs from his career recorded to capture the sound of his incendiary live performances accompanied by some of the Garifuna world's brightest musical talents.

The album has been receiving great reviews by the press: “The Garifuna have a history of escaping slavery … That experience informs the indomitable spirit and characteristic joie de vivre of their music, expressed via the paranda, a unique up-tempo rhythm and melodies that are as listenable as they are danceable to. ***** ” (Morning Star). “This is his best album to date … Recording with his band 'as live' in the studio, he brings new energy and emotion to favorites that range from the charming and slinky 'Laru Beya' to the lament 'Yange,' or a fresh version of 'Dondo,' a paranda classic driven on by tremolo electric guitar lines from Guayo Cedeño. **** ” (The Guardian).  fRoots named Aurelio as “the finest living exponent of the music of the Garifuna people” and London Evening Standard called him “one of the great artists of Latin America."

“We’re not going to let this culture die. I know I must continue my ancestors’ legacy and find new ways to express it. Few people know about it, but I adore it, and it's something I must share with the world.” Aurelio.

In 2021 a number of his songs were featured in the documentary about an excavation by the German Archaeological Institute at the coastline of Honduras accompanying an exhibition of the Rietberg Museum.

Discography

Solo records 
 2017: Darandi (Real World Records / Stonetree Records) https://realworldrecords.com/release/661/darandi/ https://aureliomusic.bandcamp.com/album/darandi
 2014: Lándini (Real World Records / Stonetree Records)
 2011: Laru Beya (Real World Records / Stonetree Records)
 2004: Garifuna Soul (Stonetree Records)
 1995: Songs of the Garifuna: Lita Ariran (JVC World Sounds)

Collaborations 
 2007: Wátina – Andy Palacio & The Garifuna Collective (Stonetree Records / Cumbancha)
 1999: Paranda – Various Artists (Stonetree Records )

References

External links 
 

Living people
Deputies of the National Congress of Honduras
Honduran male singers
Honduran musicians
Garifuna people
Garifuna music
Year of birth missing (living people)